Frank Lancaster Jones (born 1937) is an Australian sociologist specialising in social inequality, social stratification, social mobility, and national identity. He was Head of the Department of Sociology in the Research School of Social Sciences at the Australian National University (1972–2001) and has been the editor (1970–1972) and a co-editor (1990–1993) of the Australian and New Zealand Journal of Sociology (which became the Journal of Sociology). He was elected a Fellow of the Academy of the Social Sciences in Australia in 1974. During his career he played a pioneering role in the establishment and development of sociology in Australia.

Early life and education
Frank Lancaster Jones was born in 1937 in Newcastle, New South Wales. In 1957 he received a Bachelor of Arts with Honours degree in anthropology from the University of Sydney, where he was a lively student. Encouraged by John Arundel Barnes, who at the time was the chair of anthropology at the University of Sydney, Jones moved to the Australian National University. At the Australian National University he worked as a research assistant to Jerzy Zubrzycki and began a Doctor of Philosophy degree in demography under Zubrzycki's supervision. His thesis was on the Italian population of Carlton, a suburb of Melbourne, and in the course of his study he relocated to Melbourne. He received his PhD degree in 1962.

Career
Having been awarded an Australian National University Travelling Fellowship, Jones then spent some time at the London School of Economics. After a year in the United Kingdom, Jones returned to Australia in 1963 and took up an appointment at the newly established Department of Sociology in the Research School of Social Sciences at the Australian National University. He was to spend the rest of his career at the Australian National University. He was appointed Professor of Sociology and Head of the Department of Sociology in 1972, remaining in these positions until his retirement in 2001.

Jones was the editor of the Australian and New Zealand Journal of Sociology (which was to become the Journal of Sociology) between 1970 and 1972. Together with Barry Hindess, he was a co-editor of the same journal between 1990 and 1993. During his career Jones also acted as a consultant to government commissions and programs on a range of issues, including Aboriginal affairs, city development, multiculturalism, and education.

Research
Jones' research has focused on social inequality, social stratification and mobility (especially with regard to occupational and ethnic stratification), and national identity. His research is generally based on the analysis of large-scale, survey data using quantitative research methods.

Honours
Jones was elected a Fellow of the Academy of the Social Sciences in Australia in 1974.

Selected bibliography

Social inequality, stratification, and mobility

Occupational status scales

Ethnicity and national identity

Decomposing differences between groups

References

External links
 2015 reflections from Jones on the occasion of his Jubilee award from the Academy of the Social Sciences in Australia (40 years or more as a Fellow of the Academy)

Australian sociologists

1937 births
Fellows of the Academy of the Social Sciences in Australia
Living people